José Júlio de Souza Pinto (15 September 1856 - 14 April 1939) was a Portuguese painter in the Naturalist style.

Life and work
He was born in Angra do Heroísmo, the son of a doctor. He was born in the Azores and lived there until the age of fourteen. Later, he lived in Porto, where he studied at the Escola Superior de Belas-Artes with António Soares dos Reis and João António Correia. In 1880, after graduating, he and fellow student Henrique Pousão travelled to Paris on a fellowship.

Once there, he obtained a position in the studios of Alexandre Cabanel, studying with William-Adolphe Bouguereau and Adolphe Yvon at the École des Beaux-Arts. He quickly became integrated into Parisian artistic circles and placed works at all the major exhibitions, including the Salon. By 1900, he was a member of the judging panel at the Salon. Eventually, he also presented his works in Brazil and the United States.

He made frequent visits to Portugal, where he exhibited in Porto and Lisbon, and he was the first Portuguese artist to have his work displayed in the Musée du Luxembourg (now in the Musée d'Orsay). On a visit to Brittany, he became enamoured of the southern coast and lived there for the remainder of his life, painting genre scenes of the local people and villages. He died at Pont-Scorff.

Selected paintings

References

External links
 
 ArtNet: More works by Souza Pinto
 Musée d'Orsay: "The Potato Harvest", by Souza Pinto

1856 births
1939 deaths
People from Angra do Heroísmo
19th-century Portuguese painters
Portuguese male painters
19th-century male artists
20th-century Portuguese painters
20th-century male artists
University of Porto alumni